Released in 2001, Scoop 3 is a compilation of demos and alternate versions of previous Who songs and new Pete Townshend material.

History
It is the third and last Scoop collection. It contains considerably fewer demos and alternate versions of previous Who songs than the previous Scoop and Another Scoop thus it contains much more recent material than the previous albums. In addition to Who music, the album also contains songs from Townshend's decades-old albums such as The Iron Man: A Musical and All the Best Cowboys Have Chinese Eyes. Notably, one of the demos, "Marty Robbins", recorded in June 1984, would later appear in 2006 in completed form on The Who's first album in 24 years, Endless Wire, with the song retitled as "God Speaks of Marty Robbins". "All Lovers are Deranged" is a version of the song for which Townshend put lyrics to music by David Gilmour, for the latter's 1984 album About Face. Another song from the same collaboration became "White City Fighting" on Townshend's White City: A Novel.

Scoop 3 was re-issued on 29 August 2006 on the SPV label.

In 2002 a pared-down compilation of all the Scoop albums (the single-disc Scoop and the double-disc albums Another Scoop and Scoop 3) was released as Scooped. Remastered versions of the original albums were released in 2006.

Track listing
All tracks written and composed by Pete Townshend, except where noted.

References

External links
 popMATTERS review by Justin Cober-lake, 10 December 2006

2001 compilation albums
Pete Townshend compilation albums
Sequel albums